
Year 805 (DCCCV) was a common year starting on Wednesday (link will display the full calendar) of the Julian calendar.

Events 
 By place 

 Byzantine Empire 
 Siege of Patras: Local Slavic tribes of the Peloponnese lay siege to the city of Patras (modern Greece), with aid from an Arab fleet. A Byzantine relief army under Skleros, military governor (strategos) from Corinth, is sent and retakes the city. The captured Slavs in Patras are made slaves, and a church is dedicated to St. Andrew.

 Europe 
 Battle of Canburg: The Franks under Charles the Younger, son of emperor Charlemagne, defeat the Slavs near the present-day town of Kadaň, and conquer Bohemia (modern Czech Republic).
 Krum, ruler (khan) of the Bulgarian Empire, conquers and destroys the Eastern part of the Avar Khaganate (approximate date). 
 The first known mention of Magdeburg (Saxony-Anhalt), founded by Charlemagne, is made. 

 Britain 
 King Egbert of Wessex formally establishes kingship over Devon, after an integration over many years. Dumnonia is reduced to cover only the Cornish in Cornwall (approximate date).

 Asia 
 February 25 – Emperor De Zong dies after a 25-year reign, in which the fanzhen is controlled by military governors or jiedushi, who often ignore imperial decrees. He is succeeded by his son Shun Zong, who becomes ruler of the Tang Dynasty.
 August 31 – Shun Zong issues an edict to yield the throne to his son Xian Zong (Li Chun), because of an illness, taking for himself the title of "Retired Emperor" (Taishang Huang). Xian is confronted with political disputes in Zi Prefecture (Shaanxi).
 Priest Saichō, patriarch of Tendai Buddhism, visits China and introduces tea to Japan on his return (or 804).

 By topic 

 Religion 
 The Palatine Chapel in Aachen (modern Germany) is consecrated by Pope Leo III.

Births 
 García Íñiguez I, king of Pamplona (approximate date)
 Louis the German, grandson of Charlemagne and first East frankish king. (Approximate date) (d. 876)
 Liudolf, duke of Saxony (approximate date)
 Lupus Servatus, Frankish abbot (approximate date)

Deaths 
 February 25 – De Zong, emperor of the Tang Dynasty (b. 742)
 May 12 – Æthelhard, archbishop of Canterbury
 Anselm, duke of Friuli (approximate date)
 Cernach mac Fergusa, king of South Brega (Ireland) 
 Urbicius, Frankish monk (approximate date)
 Hui-kuo, Chinese Buddhist monk (b. 746)
 Jia Dan, general of the Tang Dynasty (b. 730)
 Muhammad al-Shaybani, Muslim jurist 
 Wei Gao, general of the Tang Dynasty (b. 745)

References

Sources